The 1970 U.S. Figure Skating Championships was held at the Tulsa Assembly Center in Tulsa, Oklahoma from February 4 through 7, 1970. Medals were awarded in three colors: gold (first), silver (second), and bronze (third) in four disciplines – men's singles, ladies' singles, pair skating, and ice dancing – across three levels: senior, junior, and novice.

The event determined the U.S. team for the 1970 World Championships.

Attendees at the competition noted that the standard of athleticism was rising among skaters in the lower-level divisions. Of particular note was Melissa Militano, who became one of the first female skaters to land a triple toe loop in winning the bronze medal in the junior ladies' event. Another trend was the domination of skaters from California rather than the traditional skating strongholds of the Northeast and Midwest.

Senior results

Men
Tim Wood likewise defended his title in a unanimous decision. Wood dominated the compulsory figures part of the competition but skated conservatively in the free skating as he was dealing with a sprained ankle. John Misha Petkevich, previously known primarily for his free skating ability, was a surprising second in the figures, but some found his program to music from "On the Waterfront" jarring, and his costume—a stretch jumpsuit with a white eyelet shirt—was considered unusually daring as well. Meanwhile, Kenneth Shelley, who finished third, was the audience favorite of the free skating. Shelley was also the winner of the pairs event with his partner JoJo Starbuck.

Ladies
Janet Lynn repeated as champion in a unanimous decision of the judges over Julie Lynn Holmes. Lynn won the compulsory figures as well as the free skating, where she skated a brilliant performance to Claude Debussy's "Rain Forest".

Pairs
JoJo Starbuck / Kenneth Shelley (also 3rd in men's event) won the title, following the retirement of the 1969 champions Cynthia Kauffman / Ronald Kauffman. The pairs field was considered relatively weak at this event.

Ice dancing (Gold dance)
Judy Schwomeyer / James Sladky claimed their third consecutive national title.

Junior results

Men

Ladies

Pairs

Ice dancing (Silver dance)

* Eliminated before final round

Novice results

Men

Ladies

Sources
 "U.S. Championships", Skating magazine, April 1970

U.S. Figure Skating Championships
United States Figure Skating Championships, 1970
United States Figure Skating Championships, 1970
US Figure Skating Championships
US Figure Skating Championships